Mario Bruno Lucca Guerra (born August 6, 1961 in Tucumán, Argentina) is an Argentine naturalized Chilean former footballer who played  as a defender for clubs in Argentina and Chile.

Teams
 Atlético Tucumán 1980–1985
 Nueva Chicago 1986–1987
 Vélez Sársfield 1988–1991
 Unión Española 1992–1995
 Deportes Temuco 1996–1997
 Deportes La Serena 1998–1999

Honours
 Unión Española
  Copa Chile: 1992, 1993

External links
 

1961 births
Living people
Argentine footballers
Argentine expatriate footballers
Argentina international footballers
Atlético Tucumán footballers
Club Atlético Vélez Sarsfield footballers
Nueva Chicago footballers
Unión Española footballers
Deportes La Serena footballers
Deportes Temuco footballers
Chilean Primera División players
Expatriate footballers in Chile
Association football defenders
Naturalized citizens of Chile
Sportspeople from Tucumán Province